Ischnoptera is a genus of cockroach in the family Ectobiidae.

Species
These 98 species belong to the genus Ischnoptera:

 Ischnoptera aglandis Roth, 2001
 Ischnoptera amazonica Rehn, 1916
 Ischnoptera angustifrons Hebard, 1916
 Ischnoptera anisopygia Shelford, 1913
 Ischnoptera apolinari Hebard, 1919
 Ischnoptera argentina Hebard, 1921
 Ischnoptera atrata Hebard, 1916
 Ischnoptera azteca Saussure, 1862
 Ischnoptera bahiana Rocha e Silva & Fraga, 1976
 Ischnoptera bergrothi (Griffini, 1896)
 Ischnoptera bicolorata Lopes & Oliveira, 2005
 Ischnoptera bicornuta Hebard, 1922
 Ischnoptera bilunata Saussure, 1869
 Ischnoptera borellii (Giglio-Tos, 1897)
 Ischnoptera brachyptera Princis, 1951
 Ischnoptera brasiliana Rocha e Silva, 1984
 Ischnoptera brattstroemi Princis, 1952
 Ischnoptera brunnea Rocha e Silva, 1964
 Ischnoptera caborojoensis Roth, 2001
 Ischnoptera campana Rocha e Silva & Fraga, 1976
 Ischnoptera carcarana Hebard, 1921
 Ischnoptera castanea Saussure, 1869
 Ischnoptera chichicastenanga Roth, 2001
 Ischnoptera clavator Rehn, 1918
 Ischnoptera colombiae Hebard, 1919
 Ischnoptera crispula Rehn, 1918
 Ischnoptera cristata Lopes, 2009
 Ischnoptera darlingtoni Gurney, 1942
 Ischnoptera deropeltiformis (Brunner von Wattenwyl, 1865) (dark wood cockroach)
 Ischnoptera escalerae Shelford, 1909
 Ischnoptera flagellifer Hebard, 1921
 Ischnoptera fulvipennis Princis, 1951
 Ischnoptera galibi Hebard, 1926
 Ischnoptera gatunae Hebard, 1920
 Ischnoptera hebes Walker, 1868
 Ischnoptera hercules Rehn, 1928
 Ischnoptera icano Hebard, 1921
 Ischnoptera ignobilis Saussure, 1864
 Ischnoptera iguabense Oliveira & Lopes, 2011
 Ischnoptera ikonnikovi Shelford, 1913
 Ischnoptera imparata Rehn, 1918
 Ischnoptera implicata Hebard, 1921
 Ischnoptera inca Saussure & Zehntner, 1893
 Ischnoptera inclusa Rocha e Silva, 1968
 Ischnoptera inusitata (Rocha e Silva, 1971)
 Ischnoptera irregulata Lopes, 2009
 Ischnoptera josephina Giglio-Tos, 1898
 Ischnoptera lestrelleta Roth, 2001
 Ischnoptera ligula Rehn & Hebard, 1927
 Ischnoptera linguiforma Roth, 2001
 Ischnoptera litostylata Hebard, 1921
 Ischnoptera marginata Brunner von Wattenwyl, 1865
 Ischnoptera melasa Walker, 1868
 Ischnoptera mexicana Saussure, 1862
 Ischnoptera mirella Hebard, 1920
 Ischnoptera miuda Lopes, 2009
 Ischnoptera morio Burmeister, 1838
 Ischnoptera moxa Shelford, 1913
 Ischnoptera mura Rehn, 1932
 Ischnoptera nana Saussure & Zehntner, 1893
 Ischnoptera neglecta Shelford, 1913
 Ischnoptera neoclavator Rocha e Silva, 1964
 Ischnoptera neomelasa Rocha e Silva, 1984
 Ischnoptera nigra Rocha e Silva & Fraga, 1976
 Ischnoptera nox Hebard, 1920
 Ischnoptera ocularis Saussure, 1873
 Ischnoptera oliveirai Oliveira & Lopes, 2011
 Ischnoptera oreochares Rehn & Hebard, 1927
 Ischnoptera pallipes (Scudder, 1869)
 Ischnoptera pampaconas Caudell, 1913
 Ischnoptera panamae Hebard, 1920
 Ischnoptera pantaneira Lopes, 2009
 Ischnoptera paradoxa Rocha e Silva & Lopes, 1977
 Ischnoptera paramacca Hebard, 1926
 Ischnoptera parvula Saussure, 1869
 Ischnoptera peckorum Roth, 1988
 Ischnoptera peculiaris Rocha e Silva, 1973
 Ischnoptera pedernalesensis Roth, 2001
 Ischnoptera podoces Rehn & Hebard, 1927
 Ischnoptera rehni Hebard, 1926
 Ischnoptera rufa (De Geer, 1773)
 Ischnoptera rugosa Lopes & Oliveira, 2006
 Ischnoptera santacruzensis Roth, 1992
 Ischnoptera saussurei Hebard, 1921
 Ischnoptera serrana Rocha e Silva & Vasconcellos, 1987
 Ischnoptera similis Rocha e Silva & Lopes, 1977
 Ischnoptera snodgrassi (McNeill, 1901)
 Ischnoptera speciosa Rocha e Silva & Fraga, 1976
 Ischnoptera spinosostylata Princis, 1951
 Ischnoptera stygia Hebard, 1926
 Ischnoptera taczanowskii Bolívar, 1881
 Ischnoptera tolteca Saussure, 1868
 Ischnoptera tristylata Rocha e Silva & Lopes, 1977
 Ischnoptera undulifera Walker, 1871
 Ischnoptera variegata Rocha e Silva & Lopes, 1977
 Ischnoptera vilis Saussure, 1869
 Ischnoptera vulpina Hebard, 1916
 Ischnoptera zacualtipana Roth, 2001

References

Further reading

 

Cockroaches
Articles created by Qbugbot